Little Children is a 2004 novel by the American author Tom Perrotta that interweaves the dark stories of seven main characters, all of whom live in the same suburban Boston neighborhood during the middle of a hot summer. 

The novel received critical praise, spurring The New York Times to declare Perrotta "an American Chekhov whose characters even at their most ridiculous seem blessed and ennobled by a luminous human aura."  The novel was featured on numerous "Best Books of 2004" lists—including The New York Times Book Review, Newsweek, National Public Radio, and People magazine. In 2006, the novel was adapted into an Academy Award-nominated film of the same name starring Kate Winslet, Jennifer Connelly, and Patrick Wilson.

Plot summary
Sarah, who once considered herself a radical feminist, wonders how she allowed herself to be reduced to a common housewife, constantly at the playground with three other neighborhood Stepford-esque mothers whom she can't stand. Her husband, Richard, is much older than she is, and a sort of last alternative for her love life; it is even hinted that she married him only because she feared that she would be stuck in her dead-end job as a Starbucks barista forever if she didn't. When she discovers his addiction to online pornography, she is more apathetic than repulsed.

Todd is a handsome young father whom the neighborhood women have nicknamed the "Prom King." One of the other mothers dares Sarah: "Five bucks if you get his phone number."  While jokingly discussing the bet, Todd and Sarah engage in a kiss that becomes more passionate than the ruse called for. This leads to an affair between the two, who "happen" to cross each other at the local pool and "happen" to bring their children to nap together while they have sex on the living room floor.

Larry is a retired police officer. Three years before, he left the force after shooting a black teenager brandishing a toy gun at a local shopping mall; the guilt became so unbearable that he collected his pension early. Now, his wife has left him and taken their two sons. Larry, who loved his job and refuses to let go of it, is angry that Ronald "Ronnie" McGorvey, a sex offender convicted of exposing himself to children, is allowed to live in his neighborhood, and starts a one-man vendetta to drive him out. Ronnie, for his part, finds himself ostracized by the community, and the one date his mother forces him to go on is ruined when he gives in to temptation and masturbates while watching children. Larry eventually gets into a shoving match with Ronnie's mother (May), who has a fatal stroke. Bertha, a school crossing guard and May's best friend, takes Ronnie to the hospital, where May has written him a note that reads only "Please, please be a good boy."

Todd's marriage to his gorgeous wife Kathy, a documentary filmmaker, is floundering. She resents being the primary breadwinner and continually pressures Todd to follow up on his law school education. Todd never really wanted to be a lawyer and has failed the bar exam twice already; he spends his "studying" time reliving his youth by watching a group of teenage skateboarders. Kathy later finds out about Todd's affair with the rather plain Sarah, and finds herself more insulted than angry that Todd would go for someone less attractive.

After Sarah watches Todd win a game for his neighborhood football team, they plan to leave their spouses. As Sarah prepares to leave with her daughter Lucy, Richard calls her from San Diego (where he claimed he was on business) and says that he is leaving her for an internet porn star called "Slutty Kay". Todd, meanwhile, injures himself while attempting a skateboarding trick in front of the teenage skaters, and realizes that he doesn't see a future with Sarah.

Sarah takes Lucy to the local playground late at night while waiting for Todd, but Todd never shows up. Just when she starts to lose hope, Ronald appears, crying over his mother's death. Much to her own surprise, she feels sympathy for him, until he admits that he has given in to his compulsions and killed a girl. Larry suddenly approaches, ready to kill Ronald, but finds it in his heart to offer his condolences on May's death. Sarah just sits, baffled, wondering how she will raise her daughter, whom she feels she has greatly let down.

Reception 
Writing for The New York Times, Will Blythe praised the novel, noting that Little Children raises the question of how a writer can be so entertainingly vicious and yet so full of sympathy. Bracingly tender moments stud Perrotta's satire.". Kirkus Reviews described Little Children as "Perrotta's best" novel and further remarked that, "the juxtapositions whereby Perrotta charts his several characters’ interconnected misadventures are handled with masterly authority."

References

External links
"TBR: Inside the List" interview with Perrotta in The New York Times about the minor controversy arising from the use of Pepperidge Farm goldfish on the book's cover.

2004 American novels

American novels adapted into films
Novels by Tom Perrotta
Novels set in Boston
Adultery in novels
Pedophilia in literature